The 2020–21 New York Islanders season was the 49th season in the franchise's history. It was their first full season in the Nassau Coliseum since returning to the arena full-time for the 2020–21 season, as well as their 45th overall and final season in the arena. In June 2020, the Nassau Coliseum's leaseholder announced that the arena would be closed and seek a new leaseholder, which was found in August 2020.

Due to the COVID-19 pandemic and COVID-19 cross-border travel restrictions imposed by the Government of Canada, the Islanders played a shortened 56-game regular season, which consisted of divisional play only, with the Islanders being temporarily realigned from the Metropolitan Division to the East Division.

Fan attendance in home games was prohibited until February 23, per an executive order from Governor of New York Andrew Cuomo. The Islanders reopened Nassau Coliseum to spectators on March 18.

The team made the playoffs for the third straight season when they defeated the New York Rangers on May 1, 2021. This marked the first time since the 2003–04 season that the Islanders clinched a playoff spot for a third consecutive season. They would go on to defeat the division champions Pittsburgh Penguins in the First Round in six games. Game 6 of the series was the first series-clinching game at Nassau Coliseum since 1993. After defeating Pittsburgh, the Islanders would later compete against the Boston Bruins in the Second Round and defeat them in six games. They competed against the Tampa Bay Lightning in the Stanley Cup Semifinals, where they were defeated in seven games.

Standings

Divisional standings

Schedule and results

Regular season
The regular season schedule was published on December 23, 2020.

Playoffs

The Islanders faced the Pittsburgh Penguins in the First Round, defeating them in six games.

The Islanders faced the Boston Bruins in the Second Round, defeating them in six games.

The Islanders faced the Tampa Bay Lightning in the Stanley Cup Semifinals, where they lost in seven games.

Player statistics
As of June 25, 2021

Skaters

Goaltenders

Transactions
The Islanders have been involved in the following transactions during the 2020–21 season.

Trades

Free agents

Retirement

Signings

Draft picks

Below are the New York Islanders' selections at the 2020 NHL Entry Draft, which was held on October 6 and 7, 2020, in a remote format, with teams convening via videoconferencing, and Commissioner Gary Bettman announcing selections from the NHL Network studios in Secaucus, New Jersey. It was originally scheduled to be held on June 26–27, 2020, at the Bell Centre in Montreal, Quebec, but was postponed on March 25, 2020 due to the COVID-19 pandemic and the conclusion of the 2020 Stanley Cup playoffs.

Notes

References

New York Islanders seasons
New York Islanders
New York Islanders
New York Islanders
New York Islanders